The San Diego Marriott Marquis & Marina is a hotel in San Diego, California. In the Marina district of Downtown San Diego, the hotel is composed of two towers of equal height. The two towers are the 20th tallest buildings in San Diego and are a prominent fixture in the city's skyline. The 25-story towers have a height of 361 ft (110 m) and contain 1,362 rooms. The hotel is affiliated with Marriott Hotels & Resorts.

The hotel was designed by Welton Becket and Associates, and built by developer Doug Manchester. The North Tower opened in 1984 as the Inter-Continental San Diego. The hotel doubled in size in 1987 with the addition of the south tower, at which point it was renamed San Diego Marriott Hotel and Marina. In 2008 Manchester sold the property to Host Hotels & Resorts.

Specifications
The marina is operated by Marriott in concert with the San Diego Port Authority. Its 450 slips accommodate vessels between 25 and 150 feet. Berthed sailors are eligible for all hotel amenities  delivered directly to their dock.

Renovations
In 2014, construction began on the north tower to expand Marriott Hall, its largest meeting facility, to 171,000 square feet of LEED Silver-certified meeting space.

References

External links 
Official San Diego Marriott Marquis & Marina website
Tower I and Tower II at Emporis.com
Tower I and Tower II at SkyscraperPage.com

1987 establishments in California
Hotel buildings completed in 1987
Hotels established in 1987
Skyscraper hotels in San Diego
Marinas in California
Ports and harbors of California
Twin towers